Janepob Phokhi (born 4 April 1996) is a Thai professional footballer who plays as a forward.

Club career 
Phokhi scored 6 goals in 15 matches for Police Tero in the season 2021 and transferred to Port FC for the season 2022.

International career
In 2021, he was called up by Thailand national team for the 2020 AFF Championship, which they won.

Honours

Club
 Lamphun Warrior
 Thai League 3 (1): 2020–21

International
Thailand
 AFF Championship (1): 2020

References

External links
 

1996 births
Living people
Janepob Phokhi
Janepob Phokhi
Janepob Phokhi
Association football midfielders
Janepob Phokhi
Janepob Phokhi
Janepob Phokhi
Janepob Phokhi